"I Will Wait" is a song by Swedish singer Isa. The song was released in Sweden as a digital download on 28 February 2016, and was written by Anton Hård af Segerstad, Joy and Linnea Deb, and Nikki Flores. It took part in Melodifestivalen 2016, and qualified to andra chansen from the second semi-final where it placed 3rd. In andra chansen, it was eliminated after losing to SaRaha's Kizunguzungu.

Track listing

Chart performance

Weekly charts

Release history

References

2015 songs
2016 singles
Melodifestivalen songs of 2016
Songs written by Anton Hård af Segerstad
Swedish pop songs
Sony Music singles
Isa Tengblad songs
Songs written by Joy Deb
Songs written by Linnea Deb
English-language Swedish songs
Songs written by Nikki Flores